McNeill Bay (aka Shoal Bay) lies within the boundaries of Oak Bay, British Columbia along the coast of Vancouver Island.  It was named after Captain William Henry McNeill, master of the Hudson's Bay Company steamer SS Beaver, and one of the  five original landowners of Oak Bay.

On 14 March 1843 the SS Beaver anchored in this bay, with James Douglas (Chief Factor of the Hudson's Bay Company) as the site for Fort Victoria was being scouted.

The land where the esplanade currently runs along the shoreline was a gift from Rosina Irene Margaret Ross.

References

External links
BCGNIS

Bays of British Columbia
Greater Victoria